There will be a total of 96 qualifying places available for karate at the 2015 European Games: 48 for men and 48 for women. Eight athletes will compete in each of the 12 events. Each competing nation will be allowed to enter a maximum of 12 competitors, one in each weight class. Hosts Azerbaijan is also allowed to enter an athlete in each weight class. Quota places will be allocated to the competitor(s) that achieved the place in the
qualification events.

Qualification summary

Qualification timeline

Men

60 kg

67 kg

75 kg

84 kg

+84 kg

Kata

Women

50 kg

55 kg

61 kg

68 kg

+68 kg

Kata

References

Qualification
Qualification for the 2015 European Games